Nina Kolundžić (born 29 January 1990) is a Serbian handball player for HIB Handball Graz and the Serbian national team.

She participated at the 2015 World Women's Handball Championship.

References

1990 births
Living people
Serbian female handball players
Expatriate handball players
Serbian expatriate sportspeople in Austria
Universiade medalists in handball
Universiade bronze medalists for Serbia
Medalists at the 2015 Summer Universiade